Baldwin Harbor is a hamlet and former census-designated place (CDP) in the Town of Hempstead, in Nassau County, on Long Island, in New York, United States. It was created concomitant with the 1990 United States Census from the southernmost portions of the neighboring hamlet of Baldwin. As of the 2010 census, it had a population of 8,102.

History 
The CDP was created by the United States Census Bureau at the time of the 1990 United States Census. The Baldwin Harbor CDP was merged back into the Baldwin CDP concomitant with the 2020 United States Census.

Geography

Baldwin Harbor is located within the Milburn Creek–Middle Bay drainage area, and is located within the larger Long Island Sound/Atlantic Ocean Watershed.

Demographics
As of the census of 2010, there were 8,102 people, 2,687 households, and 2,185 families residing in the CDP. The population density was 6,751.6 per square mile (2,613.5/km2). There were 2,782 housing units at an average density of 2,318../sq mi (897.4/km2). The racial makeup of the CDP was 61.25% White, 26.57% African American, 0.13% Native American, 4.87% Asian, 3.78% from other races, and 3.36% from two or more races. Hispanic or Latino of any race were 11.83% of the population.

There were 2,687 households, out of which 35.7% had children under the age of 18 living with them, 63.9% were married couples living together, 12.7% had a female householder with no husband present, and 18.7% were non-families. 14.7% of all households were made up of individuals, and 14.6% had someone living alone who was 65 years of age or older. The average household size was 3.01 and the average family size was 3.33.

In the CDP, the population was spread out, with 23.4% under the age of 18, 7.8% from 18 to 24, 22.8% from 25 to 44, 32.3% from 45 to 64, and 13.7% who were 65 years of age or older. The median age was 42.5 years. For every 100 females, there were 93.1 males. For every 100 females age 18 and over, there were 90.2 males.

The median income for a household in the CDP was $113,950, and the median income for a family was $120,344. Males had a median income of $59,855 versus $56,394 for females. The per capita income for the CDP was $33,543. About 1.6% of families and 7.1% of the population were below the poverty line, including 2.4% of those under age 18 and 3.9% of those age 65 or over.

Parks and recreation 

 Baldwin Park – A park operated by the Town of Hempstead.

Education

School district 
Baldwin Harbor is located entirely within the boundaries of (and is thus served by) the Baldwin Union Free School District. As such, all children who reside within the hamlet and attend public schools go to Baldwin's schools.

Library district 
Baldwin Harbor is located within the boundaries of the Baldwin Library District.

See also 

 Locust Grove – Another hamlet and former CDP in Nassau County.

References

Hempstead, New York
Census-designated places in New York (state)
Hamlets in New York (state)
Census-designated places in Nassau County, New York
Hamlets in Nassau County, New York
Populated coastal places in New York (state)